Oleh Anatoliyovych Leonidov (born 16 August 1985 in Dnipropetrovsk, Ukraine, Soviet Union) is a professional Ukrainian football defender who plays for MFC Mykolaiv in the Ukrainian First League.

Honours
Kolos Kovalivka
 Ukrainian Second League: 2015–16

References

External links
Profile on Football Squads

1985 births
Living people
Ukrainian footballers
FC Elektrometalurh-NZF Nikopol players
FC Sevastopol players
FC Lviv players
FC Obolon-Brovar Kyiv players
FC Naftovyk-Ukrnafta Okhtyrka players
MFC Mykolaiv players
FC Desna Chernihiv players
Association football defenders
Footballers from Dnipro